Drunk Tank is the eponymously titled debut studio album of Drunk Tank, released in 1991 by Radial Records. The CD release  of the album is appended with tracks taken from the band's first two 7" singles.

Critical reception
Drunk Tank garnered favorable reviews upon its release. Mark Woodlief of Option praised the group for their "unpredictability, sheer raging force and antisociality" and that their music "rattles the innards of the brain, shaking the listener awake to the possibilities of making fingernails on a chalkboard sound darn good." Ian Christie of Alternative Press noted the band's more focused direction and that major label interest might be forthcoming.

Track listing

Personnel
Adapted from Drunk Tank liner notes.

Drunk Tank
 Alex Barker – electric guitar
 Steven Cerio – drums
 Julian Mills – vocals, bass guitar

Production and additional personnel
 Steve Albini – recording
 Laura Brem – cover art

Release history

References

External links 
 

1991 debut albums
Drunk Tank albums
Albums produced by Steve Albini